Between 1920 and 1951 the Société des Moteurs Salmson in France developed and built a series of widely used air-cooled aircraft engines.

Design and development
After their successful water-cooled radial engines, developed from 1908 to 1918, Salmson changed their focus to air-cooling to reduce weight and increase specific power (power per unit weight). The majority of the engines produced by Salmson were of radial type with a few other arrangements such as the Salmson T6.E. In common with other engines produced by this manufacturer, the air-cooled radial engines featured the unorthodox Canton-Unné internal arrangement that dispensed with a master rod in favour of a cage of epicyclic gears driving the crankpin. Production ended in 1951 with the liquidation of the manufacturing company.

British Salmson
The 3,7 and 9 cylinder Salmsons were license-built in Great Britain, during the 1920s and 1930s, by the British Salmson engine company as the British Salmson AD.3, British Salmson AC.7, British Salmson AC.9, and British Salmson AD.9.

Salmson post-WWI engines
In common with several other French aero-engine manufacturers Salmson named their engines with the number of cylinders then a series letter in capitals followed by variant letters in lower-case. Engines not included in the 1932 table which follows are listed here:

Salmson air-cooled engines available in 1932 are listed here

Applications

Nine cylinder engines

Seven cylinder engines

7AC
 Albert A-61
 Caudron C.191&2
 Caudron C.220  
 Caudron C.270
 Dewoitine D.480
 Farman F.234
 Farman F.280
 Farman F.352
 Hanriot H.411 
 Kellner-Béchereau 23
 Morane-Saulnier MS.132
 Morane-Saulnier MS.148 
 Potez 36/5

Five cylinder engines

5Ap

 Jodel D.123

5Aq
 Caudron C.109.2
 CFA D.7 Cricri Major

5AC

 Caudron C.110
 Caudron C.161
 Jodel D.124
 Potez 36/3

Specifications (9 Ab)

See also
Salmson water-cooled aero-engines
List of aircraft engines

Notes

References
 
 Lumsden, Alec. British Piston Engines and their Aircraft. Marlborough, Wiltshire: Airlife Publishing, 2003. .
 Cuny, Jean. "Latécoère - Les Avions et Hydravions".Paris. Docavia/Editions Lariviere. 1992. 

Radial engines
1910s aircraft piston engines
Salmson aircraft engines